The Lovers of Teruel is a 1962 French musical film directed by Raymond Rouleau. It was entered into the 1962 Cannes Film Festival.

Cast
 Ludmilla Tchérina - Isa
 René-Louis Lafforgue - Barker (as René-Louis Laforgue)
 Milko Sparemblek - Manuel
 Milenko Banovitch - Diego
 Stevan Grebel - Grebelito
 Jean-Pierre Bras - Father
 Antoine Marin - Pablo
 Roberto - Dwarf
 Luce Fabiole
 Jeanne Herviale
 Philippe Rouleau - L'amoureux
 Jean Saudray - Le cycliste
 Bernadette Stern - L'amoureuse

References

External links

1962 films
1960s French-language films
1962 musical films
Films directed by Raymond Rouleau
Films scored by Mikis Theodorakis
French musical films
1960s French films